Azapride is the azide derivative of the dopamine antagonist clebopride synthesized in order to label dopamine receptors.   It is an irreversible dopamine antagonist.

References 

Dopamine antagonists
Organoazides
Chlorobenzenes
Salicylamide ethers
Piperidines
Irreversible antagonists